Saliceto is a commune in the province of Cuneo, and the region of Piedmont, Italy, located about  southeast of Turin and about  east of Cuneo.

Saliceto borders the following municipalities: Cairo Montenotte, Camerana, Cengio, Gottasecca, and Montezemolo.

Historically Saliceto was a possession of the Del Carretto  marquisses of Finale Ligure, who built here a castle in 1588. The castle was besieged in 1689 by Spanish troops.

Twin towns
 Saliceto, France

References

Cities and towns in Piedmont
Castles in Italy